The 2015 Barrow-in-Furness Borough Council election took place on 7 May 2015 to elect members of Barrow-in-Furness Borough Council in England. This was on the same day as other local elections.

Control of the council was held by the Labour Party, who had won from no overall control at the 2011 elections. Although Labour gained a higher percentage of the vote than in 2011, the Conservative Party gained 2 seats. The Socialist People's Party, which had held seats in Barrow from  1998 until 2011, folded in 2015 and so did not run for election.

Election result

References

2015 English local elections
May 2015 events in the United Kingdom
2015
2010s in Cumbria